A multifaith space or multifaith prayer room is a quiet location set aside in a busy public place (hospital, university, airport, etc.) where people of differing religious beliefs, or none at all, are able to spend time in contemplation or prayer. Many of these spaces are small, clean and largely unadorned areas, which can be adapted and serve for any religious or spiritual practice. Occasionally, persons of different faiths may come together in such spaces within the context of multifaith worship services.

The space may or may not be a dedicated place of worship. A  research project at the University of Manchester, UK has conceptualised the modern multifaith space as "an intentional space, designed to both house a plurality of religious practices, as well as address clearly defined pragmatic purposes."

Design concepts

The Manchester University research highlighted two key factors for a multifaith space to work:

 There needs to be a balance achieved for the range of different users most likely to make regular use of the space, thus preventing conflict. All norms and values need to be considered and respected, which often leads to an "unstable equilibrium where divergent worldviews can be brought together." Social cooperation and openness must be possible within the space.
 Most multifaith spaces maintain a very basic design, in order to minimize the visibility of a single faith group, whilst remaining easily adaptable to the many different practices for which the space may be utilized. Each space raises question of ethics and "national style", in which different faith members are able to participate in a mutually respectful, yet cooperative, manner.

See also
 Interfaith worship spaces
 Religious pluralism
 Religious toleration
 Universalism

References

Sacral architecture
Religious pluralism